Lilabati Mahavidyalaya, established in 2013, is the government sponsored degree college in Jateswar,  Alipurduar district.  It offers undergraduate courses in arts. It is affiliated to University of North Bengal.

See also

References

External links

University of North Bengal
University Grants Commission
National Assessment and Accreditation Council

Universities and colleges in Alipurduar district
Colleges affiliated to University of North Bengal
Educational institutions established in 2013
2013 establishments in West Bengal